Canadian Car and Foundry (CC&F), also variously known as "Canadian Car & Foundry" or more familiarly as "Can Car", was a manufacturer of buses, railway rolling stock, forestry equipment, and later aircraft for the Canadian market. CC&F history goes back to 1897, but the main company was established in 1909 from an amalgamation of several companies and later became part of Hawker Siddeley Canada through the purchase by A.V. Roe Canada in 1957. Today the remaining factories are part of Alstom after its acquisition of Bombardier Transportation completed in 2021.

History

Canadian Car & Foundry (CC&F) was established in 1909 in Montreal as the result of an amalgamation of three companies:
 Rhodes Curry Company of Amherst, NS - founded 1891
 Canada Car Company of Turcot, QC - founded 1905
 Dominion Car and Foundry of Montreal, QC
In 1911 the CC&F Board of Directors recognized that the company could improve its efficiency if they were able to produce their own steel castings, a component that was becoming common to all their products. They purchased Montreal Steel Works Limited at Longue-Pointe, the largest producer of steel castings in Canada, and the Ontario Iron & Steel Company, Ltd. at Welland, ON, which included both a steel foundry and a rolling mill.

Buses and Forestry Equipment were produced at Fort William, Ontario and railcars in Montreal and Amherst. Streetcars were manufactured between 1897 and 1913, however the company focused exclusively on rebuilding existing streetcars after 1913.

A few years later, CC&F acquired the assets of Pratt & Letchworth, a Brantford, ON, rail car manufacturer. In the latter part of World War I, the expanding company opened a new plant in Fort William (now Thunder Bay) to manufacture rail cars and ships which included the French minesweepers Inkerman and Cerisoles which were both lost in Lake Superior; the Amherst plant started by Rhodes & Curry in Amherst was closed in 1931. In an attempt to enter the aviation market, CC&F produced a small series of Grumman G.23 Goblin aircraft under licence and developed an unsuccessful, indigenous-designed fighter biplane, the Gregor FDB-1.

Canada Car Company
Canada Car Company was a railcar manufacturer based in Turcot, Quebec (a suburb of Montreal), which later merged with several other companies to form Canadian Car and Foundry in 1909. Canada Car Company was incorporated January 1905 with W.P. Coleman as president and Sir Hugh Allan as vice-president. The company's plant began operations in 1905 and manufactured freight and passenger cars.

Clients included:
 Grand Trunk Railway and Grand Trunk Pacific Railway - 12,000 freight cars and 250 passenger cars (wood)
 Quebec, Montreal & Southern - 1,500 steel underframe box cars with Dominion Car and Foundry
 Montreal Street Railway - 10 streetcars 
 Hart-Otis Car Company - Hart convertible ballast cars
 Grand Trunk Railway - 30 steel underframe flat cars
 Temiskaming & Northern Ontario Railway - three parlour-cafe cars
 Canadian Northern Railway - four wooden dining cars

Their products were:
 wood freight and passenger cars
 box cars
 streetcars
 flat cars
 parlor cafe cars
 dining cars

First World War

During World War I, CC&F had signed large contracts with Russia and Britain for delivery of ammunition. An enormous factory was constructed in the Kingsland to assemble, package, and prepare artillery shells for shipment to foreign ports. No shells were manufactured there. On 11 January 1917, a fire started in one of the buildings. In four hours, the fire spread to the approximately 500,000 pieces of 76.2 mm (3 inch) -high explosive shells stored there, causing several explosions, destroying the entire plant. The explosion launched artillery shells and building debris across the area, destroying several homes and businesses in the nearby town of Lyndhurst, and was visible from New York City. The total loss, including the ordnance, was estimated at $16,750,000 (equivalent to $ million in ).

Canadian Car and Foundry had a contract to build twelve minesweepers for the French Navy. The vessels were completed in October and November 1918—before the war ended, but too late to see operational service. Two of the vessels, the Inkerman and Cerisoles, were lost in a November gale, on Lake Superior, on their maiden voyage. Other vessels were sold into civilian service.

Second World War

By 1939, with war on the horizon, Canadian Car & Foundry and its Chief Engineer, Elsie MacGill, were contracted by the Royal Air Force to produce the Hawker Hurricane (Marks X, XI and XII). Refinements introduced by MacGill on the Hurricane included skis and de-icing gear. When the production of the Hurricane was complete in 1943, CC&F's workforce of 4,500 (half of them women) had built over 1,400 aircraft, about 10% of all Hurricanes built.

Following the success of the Hurricane contract, CC&F sought out and received a production order for the Curtiss SB2C Helldiver. Eventually, 834 Helldivers were produced by CC&F in various versions from SBW-1, SBW-1B, SBW-3,SBW-4E and SBW-5. Some of the Curtiss divebombers were sent directly to the Royal Navy under Lend-Lease arrangements. CC&F also built the North American Harvard under licence, many of the aircraft being supplied to European air forces to train post war military pilots.

In 1944, the Canadian Car & Foundry built a revolutionary new aircraft in its Montreal shops - the Burnelli CBY-3, also called the Loadmaster. There were two examples built of an aerofoil-fuselage design originally developed by Vincent J. Burnelli. The CBY-3 was never to enter full-scale production and was cancelled less than one year later.

The work of Canadian women building fighter and bomber aircraft at the plant during the Second World War is documented in the 1999 National Film Board of Canada documentary film Rosies of the North.

Postwar developments
After the Second World War, the CC&F returned to its roots as a rail car manufacturer. They also made a successful leap into the streetcar business, supplying Montreal, Toronto, Regina, Calgary, Vancouver, Edmonton, and the Brazilian cities of Rio de Janeiro and São Paulo with various types of streetcars. The company concluded a licensing agreement with ACF-Brill (the successor to J. G. Brill) in 1944 to manufacture and sell throughout Canada buses and trolley coaches of ACF-Brill design as Canadian Car-Brill, in later years often written "CCF-Brill", for short. CC&F built 1,114 trolley buses and a few thousand buses under the name. Trolleybus production ended in 1954; Edmonton Transit System's No. 202, a 1954 CCF-Brill T48A, was the last Brill trolleybus built for any city.

Production of the Brill diesel bus continued through the 1950s. In 1960, CC&F launched an entirely new TD bus design under the Canadian Car name to compete with the General Motors New Look model, but it was not successful and production was discontinued in 1962.

In 1957, wishing to diversify, the British Hawker Siddeley Group acquired CC&F through its Canadian subsidiary, A.V. Roe Canada Ltd. In 1962, A.V. Roe Canada was dissolved when the Avro Arrow program was suddenly terminated, and its assets became part of Hawker Siddeley Canada. During the 1970s they introduced the BiLevel Coach heavy railway passenger car, which would go on to great success.

In the late 1970s and early 1980s the plant built 190 Canadian Light Rail Vehicles, for the Toronto Transit Commission, to replace its aging PCC streetcars.

CCF re-emerged as Can-Car Rail in 1983 as a joint division between Hawker Siddeley Canada and UTDC. The Can-Car Rail operations were based in Thunder Bay. Sold to SNC-Lavalin in 1986, a financial shakeup led to the firm being returned to the Government of Ontario, and then quickly re-sold to Bombardier Transportation. Through a series of further acquisitions, mergers and rationalisations, CC&F faded from the annals of significant Canadian manufacturers, although the company still exists today as the Alstom railcar facility in Thunder Bay, Ontario.

Products

Railway carriages
 railway carriages for the Intercolonial Railway
 railway carriages for the Grand Trunk Railway
 railway carriages for the Grand Trunk Pacific
 railway carriages for the Canadian Northern Railways
 railway carriages for the Canadian Pacific Railway
 railway carriages for the Canadian National Railways (some later operated by Via Rail or Rocky Mountaineer)
 bi-level carriages for GO Transit - with Hawker Siddeley Canada and SNC Lavalin

Buses, trolleys and streetcars
 CCF-Brill 44S motor bus (under license in Fort William)
 CCF-Brill T44/T44A trolley bus (under license in Fort William), 1946–54
 CCF-Brill T48/T48A/T48SP trolley bus (under license in Fort William), 1949-54
 CCF-Brill TD43 motor bus (under license in Fort William)
 CCF-Brill TD51 motor bus (under license in Fort William)
 CN electric multiple units for use in Montreal
 Presidents' Conference Committee Car A6 SE DT
 Presidents' Conference Committee Car A7 SE DT
 Presidents' Conference Committee Car A8 SE DT
 Small Peter Witt cars with Ottawa Car Company
 Large Peter Witt car and trailers with J. G. Brill and Company

Aircraft
 Avro Anson Mk.II (341 built under licence plus 800 wings and 300 fuselages.)
 Avro Anson Mk.V (300 built)
 Beechcraft T-34A Mentor (125 built under license, 25 for RCAF and 100 for the United States Air Force)
 Canadian Car and Foundry CBY-3 Loadmaster (one built)
 Canadian Car and Foundry Harvard Mk.4/T-6J (555 built by CC&F post-war for RCAF and USAF for Military Defense Aid Pact)
 Canadian Car and Foundry Maple Leaf Trainer I (Wallace project, one built)
 Canadian Car and Foundry Maple Leaf Trainer II (one built and jigs and parts sold to Mexico where it became the Ares #2)
 Canadian Car and Foundry (Curtiss) SBW Helldiver (835 built under license)
 Gregor FDB-1 (one built)
 Grumman G.23 Goblin I/Delfín (52 built under license, examples sold to Spanish Republican Air Force and Royal Canadian Air Force (RCAF)) 
 Hawker Hurricane Mk.X, XI & XII (1,451 built under license)
 North American Harvard Mk.IIB/AT-16 (1,798 built under license)
 Noorduyn Norseman Mk.V (51 built after buying Noorduyn out)
 Noorduyn Norseman Mk.VII (1 built after extensive Can Car redesign)

Other vehicles and equipment
 Tanks for World War II
 Bobcat (armoured personnel carrier) - 1 prototype built and project terminated; originally developed by Leyland (Canada) which was bought out by Canadian Car and Foundry (itself acquired by Avro Canada) and terminated under Hawker Siddeley Canada
 TreeFarmer Forestry Heavy Equipment (under license from Garrett Enumclaw Co.)
Canada Diesel and Canada Diesel WT highway tractors.

Customers 
 British Columbia Electric Railway
 Canadian Northern Railways
 Canadian Pacific Railway
 Canadian National Railways
 Chambly Transport
 Edmonton Transit System
 Grand Trunk Railway
 Hamilton Street Railway
 Intercolonial Railway
 Nova Scotia Light and Power Company, Limited
 Ottawa Transportation Commission
 Quebec Railway, Light and Power Company (later Québec Autobus, post–1959)
 Royal Canadian Air Force (RCAF)
 Société de transport de Montréal
 Toronto Transportation Commission
 United States Air Force (USAF)

Preservation

Many CC&F-built buses have been preserved as historic vehicles, some in operating condition. For example, the Transit Museum Society, in Vancouver, has at least seven CC&F buses in its collection, including two CC&F-Brill trolleybuses.

See also

 J. G. Brill and Company
 Preston Car Company
 Ottawa Car Company
 Niles Car and Manufacturing Company
 Noorduyn Aviation - CC&F later built their Norseman utility aircraft (1946)
 American Car and Foundry

Notes

Bibliography

External links
 Brill Trolley
 Transit Toronto All Canadian PCC
 Canadian Car and Foundry Co. Collection McGill University Library & Archives.
 Canadian Car & Foundry Co. Ltd. Corporate Reports – McGill University Library & Archives

 
Foundries in Canada
Former defence companies of Canada
Defunct aircraft manufacturers of Canada
Defunct bus manufacturers
Motor vehicle assembly plants in Canada
Tram manufacturers
Trolleybus manufacturers
Defunct rolling stock manufacturers of Canada
Manufacturing companies based in Montreal
Hawker Siddeley
Vehicle manufacturing companies established in 1909
1909 establishments in Canada
World War II military equipment of Canada
Aviation history of Canada